The Delaware Technical Community College, Stanton Gymnasium is a 1,000-seat multi-purpose arena in Newark, Delaware on the Stanton campus of Delaware Technical Community College.

It was announced as the original home to the Delaware Stars, a basketball team in the USBL, before they moved to Pratt Gymnasium.

Basketball venues in Delaware
Buildings and structures in Newark, Delaware
Indoor arenas in Delaware